Agnes Marion Moodie (6 October 1881 - 1969) was a Scottish chemist and the first female chemistry graduate from the University of St Andrews.

Early life 
Agnes Marion Moodie was born in Arbroath on 6 October 1881, one of at least two children born to Robert Moodie, a founder of the Edinburgh Mathematical Society, who taught mathematics and physical science at Arbroath High School, and Mary Lithgow Mackintosh, daughter of Donald Mackintosh, a schoolmaster from Shotts, Lanarkshire.  Agnes had a younger brother William Moodie born on 15 March 1886.

Academic career 
Moodie and her brother both studied at the University of St Andrews where Agnes was the first female student of chemistry. Moodie gained an MA in 1902, a BSc in 1903, and graduated in 1904 with first class honours in Mathematics and Natural Philosophy. After graduating, she remained at the University of St Andrews, where she undertook research with James Irvine.  Moodie and Irvine co-authored a number of papers on alkylated sugars between 1905 and 1908.  In 1905 Moodie was awarded a Berry Scholarship in Science, and in 1807 she received a Carnegie Scholarship.  Moodie also campaigned for women to be admitted as fellows of the Royal Society of Chemistry.

Later life 
After leaving the University of St Andrews, Moodie worked for the Ministry of Education until her retirement in 1946.  Following her retirement, Moodie took up residence in Hove, where she remained until her death in 1969.

References 

Women chemists
Alumni of the University of St Andrews
Scottish scientists
Scottish chemists
1881 births
1969 deaths